Graeme Alfred Bailey (born 11 July 1943 in Ourimbah, New South Wales), is an Australian retired racing driver, best known as co-winner of the 1986 Bathurst 1000.

Career

Group C
Bailey's career emerged in the late 1970s, becoming a front runner in two-litre touring car racing in Toyota Celicas, usually driving the car raced the year prior by factory supported Sydney based Toyota racer, Peter Williamson. In 1980 Bailey won the two litre class at the Bathurst 1000 and finished 12th outright.

By 1983 small capacity class touring cars were falling out of favour, and at Bathurst the two litre class was merged into the three litre class. Bailey spent the next few years out of racing himself, although he did co-drive with Peter McLeod at the 1983 James Hardie 1000 at Bathurst in McLeod's Mazda RX-7 where they finished 5th outright. The race was run as part of the 1983 Australian Endurance Championship, which McLeod would go on to win.

Bailey again teamed with McLeod at the 1984 Castrol 500 at Sandown in Melbourne, but the RX-7 was retired after just 57 laps. The 1984 James Hardie 1000 wasn't much better for the pair, despite reportedly having the most powerful RX-7 in the field. After a troubled practice, the car was retired with overheating problems on just lap 39.

Group A
With the advent of Group A in Australia for the 1985 season, Bailey considered competing in the open class and together with regular partner Peter McLeod, the pair entered a Holden VK Commodore in the James Hardie 1000. After a strong run which had seen them rise from 22nd on the grid to the top 10 by mid-morning and into the top 5 by mid race, the near standard Commodore (as they were in 1985) was retired with a broken gearbox on lap 126.

In 1986 he sold the Celica and acquired a Holden VK Commodore SS Group A from the Roadways Racing team for the 1986 season. Teaming up with Allan Grice in a Les Small built Commodore, he took the Commodore to Europe to race in the 1986 FIA Touring Car Championship (while also commuting back to Australia to run his business and race a Les Small built Commodore in the 1986 ATCC). Bailey, who readily admitted he was not on the same level of driving as was Grice, struggled in Europe and in both the first and second rounds of the series at Monza and Donington Park respectively, he ended the Commodore's race when he spun off into sand traps causing the cars retirement from both races. Budgetary problems saw the team return to Australia earlier than they had hoped, but with renewed confidence, though teamed with Peter Brock's two car Holden Dealer Team, the team won the "Kings Cup" prize at the Spa 24 Hours race on the famous Circuit de Spa-Francorchamps in Belgium (although Bailey was present, he did not drive).

At the 1986 James Hardie 1000, Grice and Bailey dominated the race, finally giving Grice a long deserved Bathurst victory. Bailey only drove the 30 lap lunch time stint during the race, but with Grice in career best form he admitted that was their best chance of victory, though a measure of his progress as a driver was shown when he was able to hold a 5-10 second gap to the HDT Commodore of four time Bathurst winner Allan Moffat (though Moffat was hampered by a very sore wrist after having crashed the car in qualifying). From there Bailey drove his Bathurst winning Commodore in the Group A support race at the 1986 Australian Grand Prix in Adelaide, finishing a close 7th behind the Nissan Skyline DR30 RS of young charger Glenn Seton (Grice won the race in another Roadways built Commodore).

Bailey's career wound down at that point, choosing to concentrate on the successful family business, Chickadee Foods which was sold to Inghams in 2004.

Bailey's son briefly raced in Sports Sedans in the mid-2000s, racing a Chevrolet powered Nissan 300ZX.

Career results

Complete Australian Touring Car Championship results
(key) (Races in bold indicate pole position) (Races in italics indicate fastest lap)

Complete European Touring Car Championship results
(key) (Races in bold indicate pole position) (Races in italics indicate fastest lap)

Complete Bathurst 1000 results

Complete Sandown Enduro results

References

1943 births
Australian Touring Car Championship drivers
Bathurst 1000 winners
Living people
People from the Central Coast (New South Wales)
Racing drivers from New South Wales
Australian Endurance Championship drivers